The Universalist Unitarian Church of Riverside, previously known as the All Souls Universalist Church, is a Universalist Unitarian church located in Riverside, California, United States.

It was built during 1891-92.  It was listed on the National Register of Historic Places as "All Souls Universalist Church" in 1978. Also it is listed as Riverside city landmark #3.

It is a rare and elegant example, perhaps the only example for its era, of architecture in California using the Permian age Supai sandstone of the Arizona plateau area.

References

External links
 Home page for the Unitarian Universalist Church of Riverside
 

Churches in Riverside County, California
Buildings and structures in Riverside, California
Unitarian Universalist churches in California
Universalist Church of America churches
National Register of Historic Places in Riverside County, California
Churches on the National Register of Historic Places in California
Churches completed in 1892
1890s architecture in the United States
Landmarks in Riverside, California
Gothic Revival church buildings in California
1892 establishments in California